Thorong La or Thorung La is a mountain pass with an elevation of  above sea level in the Damodar Himal, north of the Annapurna Himal, in central Nepal. Thorong Ri on the slope of Khatung Kang and Yakawa Kang are the mountains forming Thorong La. The pass is located on a trail which connects the village of Manang in the Manang District to the east, with the temple of Muktinath and the nearby village of Ranipauwa, in the Mustang District to the west. Thorong La is the highest point on the Annapurna Circuit, a  route around the Annapurna mountain range. In addition to trekkers, the pass is regularly used by local traders.

Mountaineering

Most trekkers cross the pass from east to west (Manang to Muktinath), which is the easiest and safest direction. It is not possible to cross Thorong La from Manang to Muktinath in one day. Choosing this option decreases the elevation gain and loss for that day's hike, as well as decreasing the distance. The staff of the Himalayan Rescue Association post in Manang recommend that trekkers spend five nights between their arrival in Manang and the crossing to Muktinath. The additional time spent in Manang allows trekkers to acclimatize sufficiently to minimize the risk of acute mountain sickness (AMS). The Himalayan Rescue Association operates a medical clinic at Manang, and periodically a small outpost at Thorong Phedi.

The route from west to east (Muktinath to Manang) is much more difficult, because it does not allow most trekkers sufficient time for acclimatization to the altitude. Trekkers going from west to east must therefore ascend at least  and descend at least  in one day.

The safest months to cross the pass are March–April and October–November. Attempting to cross Thorong La at other times of the year is dangerous due to the increased risk of avalanches, frostbite and the likelihood of a storm or a whiteout, which can cause trekkers to become disoriented and lost. Trekkers usually depart Thorung Pedi / Thorung High camp a few hours before sunrise, as strong winds typically begin a few hours after sunrise.

Local climate

The local climate on the western side of the pass is much drier than on the eastern side. There is practically no vegetation on the western side, except where irrigated, while in the Manang valley there is much more vegetation and cultivation is possible, while it is still fairly dry, as the valley is protected from the wet southern monsoon winds by the Annapurna mountain range.

2014 disaster

After a heavy blizzard from Cyclone Hudhud about forty people, including trekkers, guides and locals, were killed around Thorong La. Hampered by 1.8 meters of snow within twelve hours and disruption of cell service in the Manang District, local forces were able to rescue ca. 300 people by helicopter.

References

 Stan Armington, "Trekking in the Nepal Himalaya". Lonely Planet, 2001.

Mountain passes of Nepal
Mountain passes of the Himalayas
Hiking trails in Nepal